The American Legion was a provincial cavalry and infantry corps (regiment) of the British Army in the American War of Independence commanded by Brigadier General Benedict Arnold.

History 
The American Legion is notable 
for the fact that Brigadier General Benedict Arnold, who had previously served the United States and had defected to the British in 1780, was the commanding officer. It was organised in October 1780 at New York. The Legion accompanied Arnold in his raid upon Virginia. It was with him in his expedition into Connecticut in September 1781, in which two forts were stormed and dismantled, and the town of New London plundered and burned. The Legion was disbanded on 24 October 1783 at New Brunswick.

Uniform 
The Legion's uniform consisted of a red coat with green facings. The coat had short tails, as opposed to those worn by British Regulars who wore long tails.

References

Further reading

See also  
 Military career of Benedict Arnold, 1781

External links 

 Index to American Legion History at Royalprovincial.com

1780 establishments in New York (state)
1783 disestablishments in New Brunswick
Benedict Arnold
Corps of the British Army
Loyalist military units in the American Revolution
Military units and formations established in 1780
Military units and formations disestablished in 1783